Zack Nash (born September 23, 1989) is an American football linebacker who last played for the Arizona Cardinals of the National Football League (NFL). He signed with the Arizona Cardinals as an undrafted free agent. He played college football at Sacramento State.

College career
He played college football at Sacramento State. After the 2010 season, he was selected to the second team All-America. He was selected to the all-Big Sky Conference first team.

Professional career

Arizona Cardinals
On April 30, 2012, he signed with the Arizona Cardinals as an Undrafted free agent. On August 24, 2012, he was released. On October 30, 2012, he was promoted from the practice squad after the team released Fullback Reagan Mauia.

References

External links
Sacramento State Hornets bio
Arizona Cardinals bio

1989 births
Living people
American football linebackers
Sacramento State Hornets football players
Arizona Cardinals players
People from Dixon, California